Mauricio Barrientos (professionally known as "El Diablito") is a Mexican actor, stand-up comedian, and writer. He is known for starring in films such as Compadres, Tod@s caen, and Un rescate de huevitos.

Filmography

Film

Television

References

External links
El Diablito (@diablitohigh) on Twitter
Sensacine profile (Spanish)

1984 births
Living people
Mexican male comedians
Mexican male film actors
Mexican male telenovela actors